Joseph Meyer may refer to:

 Joseph Meyer (publisher) (1796–1856), German publisher
 Joseph Meyer (songwriter) (1894–1987), American songwriter
 Joseph Meyer (Wyoming politician) (1941–2012), American politician
 Joseph A. Meyer (c. 1895–1970), American football and basketball coach
 Joseph E. Meyer (1878–1950), American botanist
 Joey Meyer (basketball) (born 1949), former DePaul head basketball coach
 Joey Meyer (baseball) (born 1962), former major league baseball player
 Joseph Meyer (rower), Swiss Olympic medalist
 Joe Meyer (equestrian) (born 1970), New Zealand equestrian
 Joseph Meyer, publisher of the New York Observer

See also
 Joseph Mayer (disambiguation)
 Joe Meyers (disambiguation)
 Josef Mayr (1900–1957), German mayor of Augsburg